Bill is a surname, and may refer to:

Alfred H. Bill (1879-1964), American writer
Charles Bill (1843–1915), British politician
Edward Lyman Bill (1862-1916), founder and editor of the magazine Talking Machine World
Ian Bill (born 1944), Scottish footballer
Max Bill (1908–1994), Swiss architect, artist and designer
Per Bill (1958–) Swedish politician
William Bill (c. 1505–1561), English churchman and academic
Bills is a surname, and may refer to: 

 Kizziah J. Bills (1860–1924), Black American suffragist, a correspondent and columnist for Black press in Chicago, and a civil rights activist.
 Michael A. Bills (born 1958) American retired lieutenant general in the United States Army.